was a Japanese statesman and diplomat.

Biography
Matsui was a native of Osaka Prefecture, and a graduate of the Law School of Tokyo Imperial University in 1889. He entered the Ministry of Foreign Affairs the same year. In 1890, he was assigned to the Japanese embassy in Seoul, Korea, and in 1895 was assigned to the Japanese embassy in the United States. In 1898, he was promoted to the position of First Secretary at the Japanese Embassy in London, United Kingdom. In 1902, he was reassigned to the Japanese embassy in Peking, China, returning to Japan in 1913.

During the First World War, served as Japanese Ambassador to France and was a plenipotentiary at the 1919 Paris Peace Conference. On the successful completion of this mission, he was awarded with the title of baron (danshaku) under the kazoku peerage system. He served as Japanese Minister of Foreign Affairs from January 7 to June 11, 1924, under the administration of Kiyoura Keigo and was also appointed a member of the House of Peers in the Diet of Japan. He later served as Ambassador to the United Kingdom in 1925–1928. In 1938, he became a member of the Privy Council.

References
Phillips Payson O'Brien 2004. The Anglo-Japanese Alliance, 1902-1922, Routledge,

Further reading
 Obituary in the New York Times

1868 births
1946 deaths
People from Osaka Prefecture
University of Tokyo alumni
Kazoku
Ambassadors of Japan to the United Kingdom
Ambassadors of Japan to France
Ambassadors of Japan to China
Foreign ministers of Japan
Members of the House of Peers (Japan)
Government ministers of Japan
20th-century diplomats